Dieter Schwarz (born 24 September 1939) is a German billionaire businessman, and owner of the Schwarz-Gruppe. He is the former chairman and CEO of the supermarket chain Lidl, and the hypermarket chain Kaufland.

Career
In 1973, Dieter Schwarz joined the "Lidl & Schwarz KG" business of his father Josef Schwarz and opened the company's first discount supermarket, inspired by the brothers Albrecht. After his father died in 1977, he took control of the discount chain. He became CEO and expanded the business outside of Germany. 
Soon afterwards, Schwarz bought the naming rights for Lidl from an unrelated person named Ludwig Lidl, a former schoolteacher, in order to side-step a legal battle with the co-owner A. Lidl.

Net worth
In 2009, he was estimated to be worth 10 billion euro. As of October 2012, he was estimated to be worth 12 billion euro, an increase from 11.5 billion euro in 2011. In 2013, he was estimated be worth €19.6 billion, and ranked the 24th richest person in the world. As of February 2014, he was ranked as 23rd richest person in the world in the Hurun Report Global Rich List.

In June 2021, Bloomberg Billionaires Index listed Schwarz as the 61st richest person in the world with an estimated net worth of US$27.3 billion.
Since 1999, Schwarz manages his resources through the tax-exempt Dieter Schwarz Foundation (gGmbH, limited liability company with a charitable purpose), when he transferred his shares in Lidl and Kaufland into it, deciding just how much of his profits go into the foundation. The Dieter Schwarz Foundation supports education and daycare facilities for children, for example, as well as science and research projects.

Personal life
In 1963, Schwarz married Franziska Weipert. They live in Heilbronn and have two daughters. Schwarz is known to be very protective of his privacy, in an extent that no media recordings of Schwarz exist and he refuses any kind of interview. Meanwhile, just three photos of him are known to exist in the press or in the image search of Google.

References

1939 births
Living people
Businesspeople from Baden-Württemberg
German billionaires
People from Heilbronn
Recipients of the Order of Merit of Baden-Württemberg
German chief executives
German businesspeople in retailing
20th-century German businesspeople
21st-century German businesspeople